Placosoma limaverdorum is a species of lizard in the family Gymnophthalmidae. It is endemic to Brazil.

References

Placosoma (lizard)
Reptiles of Brazil
Endemic fauna of Brazil
Reptiles described in 2016
Taxa named by Diva Maria Borges-Nojosa
Taxa named by Ulisses Caramaschi
Taxa named by Miguel Trefaut Rodrigues